Saša Jovanović may refer to:

Saša Jovanović (footballer, born 1974), Serbian association football manager, and former player
Saša Jovanović (footballer, born 1991), Serbian association football player who plays for Córdoba CF
Saša Jovanović (footballer, born 1993), Serbian association football player who plays for Čukarički
Saša Jovanović (footballer, born 1988), Serbian football forward who plays for Mosta